Aleksey Sergeyevich Antilevsky (born 2 February 2002) is a Belarusian professional footballer who plays for Slavia Mozyr on loan from Torpedo-BelAZ Zhodino.

His brother Dmitry Antilevsky is also a professional footballer.

References

External links 
 
 

2002 births
Living people
Belarusian footballers
Association football midfielders
FC Dynamo Brest players
FC Rukh Brest players
FC Torpedo-BelAZ Zhodino players
FC Slavia Mozyr players